In Norse mythology, Ótr (alternately: Ott, Oter, Otr, Ottar, Ottarr, Otter) is a dwarf. He is the son of the king Hreidmar and the brother of Fafnir and Regin.

According to the Prose Edda, Ótr could change into any form and used to spend his days in the shape of an otter, greedily eating fish. In this form, he was slain by Loki, who wanted his pelt. Initially, Hreidmar demanded a life for a life, but with the argument that the murder had been an accident when no one involved knew that Ótr was a dwarf, he settled for receiving a large weregild for Ótr's death, namely to fill Ótr's skin with yellow gold and to then cover it entirely with red gold. When the skin was covered, one whisker still protruded, forcing Loki to give up the ring Andvarinaut to hide it. The ring had been stolen from, and cursed by, the dwarf Andvari. It is suggested that this story was meant to show the benefits of not only adhering to the letter of the law (repayment for manslaughter) but sticking to the spirit of the law as well (demanding an exorbitant ransom). Greed for this cursed treasure ultimately caused the deaths of Hreidmar and his two surviving sons: Hreidmar was killed by Fafnir, who transformed into a dragon, and the other two were slain by Sigurd's sword Gram.

References

Nibelung tradition
Norse dwarves
Shapeshifting
Völsung cycle
Fictional otters

sv:Dvärg (mytologi)#Dvärgar med mindre roller